Tracks in the Snow (Dutch: Pervola, sporen in de sneeuw, also known as Pervola) is a 1985 Dutch drama film written and directed by Orlow Seunke. It was entered into the main competition at the 42nd Venice International Film Festival and won the Golden Calf Special Jury Prize at the Netherlands Film Festival.

Plot

Cast 

 Gerard Thoolen as Simon van Oyen
  Bram van der Vlugt as Hein van Oyen  
  Melle van Essen as Aapo  
  Jan Willem Hees as vader Van Oyen  
  Thom Hoffman as Ron  
  Jaap Hoogstra as Olga  
  Brigitte Kaandorp as Truusje

References

External links
  

1985 films
Dutch drama films
1985 drama films